Mario Barić (born April 15, 1985) is a Bosnian Croat retired footballer.

Club career
Born in Travnik, SR Bosnia and Herzegovina, back then part of Yugoslavia, Barić initially played with Croatia Sesvete and NK Žminj from where he moved to NK Karlovac in 2007, at time paying in the Croatian Second League. He managed promotion with Karlovac to the Croatian First League in 2008 and played two more seasons with them in Croatian top level.

During the winter-break of the 2010–11 season, he moved to Belgium where he joined K.A.A. Gent and played two years with them in Belgian First Division A. At thewinter-break of the 2012–13 season he left Gent and returned to Croatia where he played the second half of the season with Slaven Belupo in the Croatian First League. The following summer, he, along his compatriot Matej Delač, joined Serbian SuperLiga side FK Vojvodina. However, while Delač became main goalkeeper, Barić only played few games, none of which in the league, thus it was no surprise he was released by Vojvodina at the following winter-break despite having initially signed a two-year contract.

During the winter-break of 2013–14 season, both Barić and Delač left Vojvodina and joined FK Sarajevo. That was his first club in the Premier League of Bosnia and Herzegovina. He stayed with Sarajevo two years, until the winter-break of the 2015–16 season and will make a total of 35 appearances in official games and scored one goal. That winter-break he moved to another Bosnian Premier League club, NK Vitez where he played until the end of the season.

In summer 2016 he signed with HŠK Zrinjski Mostar. He was released by Zrinjski in October, 2017.

In 2018, Baric joined NK Dubrava. He played there until February 2019, where he joined NK Zelina.

He finished his career at Austrian lower league side SV Wolfau.

Career statistics

Honours

FK Sarajevo
 Bosnia and Herzegovina Football Cup: 2013–14
 Premier League of Bosnia and Herzegovina: 2014–15

Zrinjski
 Premier League of Bosnia and Herzegovina: 2016–17, 2017–18

References

External links

1985 births
Living people
People from Travnik
Croats of Bosnia and Herzegovina
Association football fullbacks
Bosnia and Herzegovina footballers
Croatian footballers
NK Žminj players
NK Karlovac players
K.A.A. Gent players
NK Slaven Belupo players
FK Vojvodina players
FK Sarajevo players
NK Vitez players
HŠK Zrinjski Mostar players
NK Dubrava players
NK Zelina players
First Football League (Croatia) players
Croatian Football League players
Belgian Pro League players
Serbian SuperLiga players
Premier League of Bosnia and Herzegovina players
Croatian expatriate footballers
Expatriate footballers in Belgium
Croatian expatriate sportspeople in Belgium
Expatriate footballers in Serbia
Croatian expatriate sportspeople in Serbia
Expatriate footballers in Austria
Croatian expatriate sportspeople in Austria